is the mayor of Niigata, Niigata in Japan. He was first elected in 2002.

References 
 

1948 births
Living people
People from Niigata (city)
Mayors of places in Japan